Nadowli Kaleo is one of the constituencies represented in the Parliament of Ghana. It elects one Member of Parliament (MP) by the first past the post system of election. Nadowli Kaleo is located in the Nadowli-Kaleo District of the Upper West Region of Ghana.

Boundaries 
The seat is located within the Nadowli-Kaleo District of the Upper West Region of Ghana. Its western neighbour is la Côte d'Ivoire. To the north is the Jirapa District, to the east the Daffiama-Bussie-Issa constituency and to the south east the Wa Municipal District and to the south the Wa West District.

History 
The constituency was changed in 2012 when the initial Nadowli District was divided into the Nadowli-Kaleo District and Daffiama-Bussie-Issa District. Therefore, the Nadowli Kaleo became the constituency rather than the initial Nadawli West and the Nadowli East constituency was also changed to Daffiama-Bussie-Issa constituency.

Members of Parliament 
for initial 1992–2000 (Nadawli North) 2004–2008 (see Nadowli West)

References

See also 

 List of Ghana Parliament constituencies

Parliamentary constituencies in the Upper West Region